Cisowa  is a district of Gdynia, Poland, located in the north-western part of the city.

Cisowa was a royal village of the Kingdom of Poland, administratively located in the Puck County in the Pomeranian Voivodeship.

Transport
The Gdynia Cisowa railway station is located in Cisowa.

References

Districts of Gdynia